Popinovo is a rural locality (a village) in Petushinskoye Rural Settlement, Petushinsky District, Vladimir Oblast, Russia. The population was 17 as of 2010. There are 4 streets.

Geography 
Popinovo is located 17 km northwest of Petushki (the district's administrative centre) by road. Chupriyanovo is the nearest rural locality.

References 

Rural localities in Petushinsky District